Morton County is the name of two counties in the United States:

 Morton County, Kansas 
 Morton County, North Dakota